Shatsk may refer to:
Shatsk, Russia, a town in Ryazan Oblast, Russia
Shatsk, Ukraine, an urban-type settlement in Volyn Oblast, Ukraine